The Hallische Händel-Ausgabe ("Halle Handel Edition") is a multi-volume collection of the works of George Frideric Handel. It was first published in the 1950s: initially as an adjunct to the HG edition, but by 1958 as a collected edition in its own right. The collection's abbreviation of "HHA" can be used to identify individual works by Handel, for example Handel's Messiah can be referred to as "HHA i/17" (with the Roman numeral "i" designating "series 1"). For practical use, the HHA numbering of Handel's works has been superseded by the HWV numbering system.

Published by the George Frideric Handel Society, a major new edition comprising approximately 128 volumes is being released. It is expected to be completed by 2023 in the following configuration:

See also
Händel-Gesellschaft (HG)
Händel-Werke-Verzeichnis (HWV)
List of compositions by George Frideric Handel

References

External links

George Frideric Handel
Collected editions of classical composers
Classical music catalogues